The graceful priapella (Priapella bonita), also known by its original Spanish name guayacon ojiazul, is a species of freshwater fish within the family Poeciliidae. It is considered to be data deficient. It is endemic to a small part of central Veracruz in Mexico. It has not been recorded recently and is thought most  likely to be extinct, however, the IUCN states that there is an outside chance that the species clings on in a hereto unsurveyed part of its known range and so list it as Data Deficient. The American ichthyologist Seth Eugene Meek described this fish as Gambusia bonita in 1904 with the type locality given as Río Tonto at Refugio, Veracruz, Mexico. It is the type species of the genus Priapella.

References

Rodriguez, C.M., 1997. Phylogenetic analysis of the tribe Poeciliini (Cyprinodontiformes: Poeciliidae). Copeia 1997(4):663-679.

Priapella
Freshwater fish of Mexico
Taxonomy articles created by Polbot
Taxa named by Seth Eugene Meek
Fish described in 1904
Papaloapan River